Andreas Jochen Hippel (born October 14, 1971) is a musician from Kirchheimbolanden in southwest Germany. He played one of the most prominent roles in computer music during the 16-bit microcomputer era, composing hundreds of tunes for games and demos. He was also an experienced Amiga programmer and ported many of Thalion Software's Atari ST titles. He no longer composes music for a living and in 2006 he was working in Logistics for Matheis+Koebig Baustoffe Atari Scene and STNICCC News

Jochen's first computer music was a set of Christmas songs that he arranged in a rock style on his school's Commodore 64.

As a member of The Exceptions under the handle Mad Max, he wrote most of the music for their demos including the B.I.G. Demo (Best in Galaxy). The demo was essentially a large collection of C64 tunes that was ported across to the Atari ST's Yamaha YM2149 sound chip using Jochen's own driver to get the most out of it. Jochen then had to fix all the music in order to get it to sound correct on the ST as the YM2149 has no resonance filter, no Oscillator sync, no combined waveforms, no ASDR enveloping and no ring modulation, and it has fewer waveforms than the MOS Technology 6581. Composers (such as Rob Hubbard) used a lot of special effects in their music which was difficult to replicate on the ST's sound chip.

Another note of interest is that the B.I.G. demo contained an additional demo screen entitled "The Digital Department" containing 6 digital versions of C64 tunes. The sound routine used each channel of the YM2149 as a 4-bit DAC and played samples for each instrument. This is the first time music using PCM sample instruments is heard on the Atari ST, unfortunately only one more piece of music is ever written using this routine, albeit the 16-minute-long Knuckle Busters tune by Rob Hubbard. This appears as a guest screen in the Cuddly Demos (written by The Carebears) and was used to torment Richard Karsmakers of ST News who was promptly chained to a chair as the disk was formatted before his very eyes!

He worked as a freelance musician, doing music for many 16-bit games. He eventually joined Thalion Software as a programmer and musician. His musical track for the game Amberstar is considered among his best works, and the game and Hippel's music acquired a cult following. For in game music on the Amiga Jochen often stuck to chiptune-like sound – that became his trademark – instead of using more "realistic" instrument sounds that machine's support for digitized sound made possible. Title music for Wings of Death and Lethal Xcess are exceptions.

He has released an album called Give it a Try and has composed music for other albums including tracks on Immortal 2 and Immortal 3 Amiga Immortal.

Hippel was also a programmer, he created all of his own music tools and also ported most of Thalion's early Atari ST titles to the Amiga. Hippel also created the Amiga 7 voice replay routine which was used in several Thalion and Eclipse titles and later used by Chris Hülsbeck in his TFMX replay routine for the title music of Turrican 2 and Turrican 3 for which he wrote the in game loading music.

Video game music
Most songs which are for Atari ST only are conversions while works for both machines are usually Hippel's own compositions.

Data provided by Hall of Light, Atari Legend, Atarimania and Lemon Amiga games databases.

References

External links
Artist profile at OverClocked ReMix
Bio on Thalion Webshrine
Listing of his work on Atari Legend
Listing of his work on HOL
Jochen Hippel as a member of the band The 4 Penöre
Jochen Hippel Jochen Hippel at imdb.com

Video game composers
Demosceners
German male musicians
Living people
1971 births
People from Kirchheimbolanden